Antonio José González Zumárraga (March 18, 1925 – October 13, 2008) was an Ecuadorian Cardinal  of the Catholic Church.

González Zumárraga was born in Pujili, Ecuador. He was ordained priest on July 29, 1951, following studies at the San José seminary in Quito and the Pontifical University of Salamanca, Spain, where he obtained a doctorate in canon law.

He was made auxiliary bishop of Quito on May 17, 1969 (with the titular diocese of Tagarata) and was consecrated as bishop in Quito on June 15, 1969, by Cardinal Pablo Muñoz Vega, SJ, Archbishop of Quito.

He was made Bishop of Machala on June 30, 1978, and then Coadjutor Archbishop of Quito on June 28, 1980. He succeeded to full governance of the Archdiocese on June 1, 1985.

He was created as a Cardinal Priest (Cardinal Priest of Santa Maria in Via) in 2001 by Pope John Paul II.

References

External links

Antonio José González Zumárraga

1925 births
2008 deaths
People from Pujilí
Ecuadorian cardinals
Pontifical University of Salamanca alumni
Cardinals created by Pope John Paul II
Roman Catholic bishops of Machala
Roman Catholic bishops of Quito
Roman Catholic archbishops of Quito